"Time After Time" is the first episode of the third season of the HBO original series The Wire. The episode was written by David Simon from a story by David Simon & Ed Burns and was directed by Ed Bianchi. It originally aired on September 19, 2004.

Plot
Detectives Jimmy McNulty and Leander Sydnor monitor drug lieutenant Melvin "Cheese" Wagstaff. At the Major Case Unit, Lester Freamon, Roland "Prez" Pryzbylewski and new member Caroline Massey monitor a wiretap. Sydnor observes that Cheese does not use a phone, instead conducting his business face-to-face and receiving phone messages through his subordinate. After being relieved by Freamon and Kima Greggs, McNulty is told by ASA Rhonda Pearlman and Lieutenant Cedric Daniels that they are considering the abandonment of the wire. McNulty, believing the wire will eventually reach Proposition Joe and Stringer Bell, heatedly asserts that Bell is their target and that all other objectives are secondary. Daniels insists they need a break in the case to justify continued use of the wiretaps.

McNulty, Greggs and Freamon observe a dealer named Drac, who is far less discreet on the phone than Cheese's crew. Freamon states that Drac is supplied by Lavelle Mann, one of Joe's soldiers; Sydnor has been developing a connection with Mann through undercover work for some time. They plan to arrest Mann in the hope that Drac, Joe's nephew, will be promoted and give them more information on the organization through his careless talk on the wire. Daniels takes the plan to Acting Commissioner Ervin Burrell, who is reluctant to fund more wiretaps. Burrell later reports to Daniels that Mayor Clarence Royce is now holding up the proposal to promote Daniels to the position of Major because Daniels' wife Marla is set to challenge one of the mayor's allies in an upcoming election. Burrell tells Daniels that the mayor will not make him a commander until he knows where Marla stands politically.

McNulty goes to an Orioles game with his old partner Bunk Moreland. He meets his estranged wife Elena to take his children for the second half. Despite it being his day off, Bunk is forced to leave the game early when he is called to work a murder scene. The following day, Daniels marshals his men for the hand-to-hand on Mann. Once out in the field, Greggs and McNulty make a clean arrest and Sydnor maintains his cover. Drac immediately starts talking about a possible promotion on the wire. Unfortunately for the detail, the promotion goes to Cheese instead. After McNulty and Daniels argue over the future of the case, Freamon chastises McNulty for his confrontational attitude and self-absorption. At midnight, Prez finds McNulty reviewing old files from the Barksdale investigation. As Massey leaves, McNulty explains his research to her as a way to avoid making the same mistakes again.

In the Western District, Sergeant Ellis Carver marshals his new squad and plans a sting on a corner drug dealing operation. He and Thomas "Herc" Hauk eventually chase down a runner named Tyrell. Elsewhere, Major Howard "Bunny" Colvin greets two new officers to his district, Aaron Castor and Brian Baker. When Carver and Herc bring Tyrell in with no evidence for a drug charge, Colvin criticizes their use of resources. Later, as he prepares to patrol the Western, he is disappointed to see that Carver's squad has brought in more street dealers on loitering charges with no leads into their distributors. Colvin further sees the urban decay blighting the neighborhood thanks to rampant crime. He is even more disgusted when a young drug dealer, Justin, approaches him despite his being in uniform.

Bodie Broadus, Poot Carr and Puddin reminisce about the Barksdale towers, which are being demolished. Bell chairs a meeting to discuss the Barksdales' new direction now that their main territory is lost; Bodie suggests that they take new territory by force. Bell instead suggests that they supply other dealers with their product rather than battle over territory, urging his subordinates to think like businessmen. Meanwhile, in prison, Wee-Bey Brice talks to former Barksdale soldier Dennis "Cutty" Wise, who is about to be paroled. Avon Barksdale asks Cutty for help securing new territory and gives him a number to call when he is released. Once outside, Cutty arranges a meeting with Shamrock and is given directions to a package of narcotics. Cutty observes one of Marlo Stanfield's crews and strikes a deal with the leader, Fruit, to work the package for a share of the profit. When Cutty returns later that night, Fruit tells him his stash was confiscated by police and drives him away with a gun.

Bubbles and Johnny lose control of their cart, which crashes into the car of Marlo's driver. He takes their trousers as punishment. After buying new pants, they are unable to afford drugs for the both of them. Elsewhere, Royce delivers a speech at the demolition ceremony for the towers. Councilman Tommy Carcetti grills Burrell and Deputy Commissioner William Rawls about increased violent crime in East Baltimore during a review meeting. Over lunch, Burrell declines an offer by Carcetti to help him if Royce shorts him on funding. He meets with Royce and his chief of staff, Coleman Parker, who speculates Carcetti is preparing to run for mayor. Royce dismisses Carcetti's chances of winning in a majority-black city, but Parker is concerned he could use rising crime figures to his advantage. Royce and Parker pressure Burrell to have the Baltimore Police reduce violent crime citywide by 5% in each district and keep murders under 275 for the year.

At the next ComStat meeting, Burrell tells his men to cut the felony rate by Royce's figures. Colonel Raymond Foerster, now in charge of the CID, is dismayed at the directive. Colvin realizes how the commanders have been encouraged to water down their figures and questions how they could "juke the stats" with murder victims. Burrell threatens to replace commanders who fail to deliver the figures he wants. Later, Daniels attends a meeting at his home with State Delegate Odell Watkins and Marla's other political contacts. Once they have left, Marla thanks him and he returns to sleep at the office.

Production

Credits

Starring cast

Aidan Gillen, Robert Wisdom, Seth Gilliam, Domenick Lombardozzi, Jim True-Frost, Corey Parker Robinson, J. D. Williams, and Michael K. Williams are all new additions to the opening credits this season. Aidan Gillen is new to the series while the other actors have all previously appeared as guest stars. Robert Wisdom first appeared as Howard "Bunny" Colvin in a guest starring role in the second season episode "Stray Rounds". Corey Parker Robinson had a recurring role as Leander Sydnor in the first season but did not appear in the second season. Jim True-Frost (Roland "Prez" Pryzbylewski), Seth Gilliam (Ellis Carver), Domenick Lombardozzi (Thomas "Herc" Hauk), J. D. Williams and Michael K. Williams all had significant recurring roles in the first two seasons. Although credited, Michael K. Williams does not appear in this episode.

Guest stars
Glynn Turman as Mayor Clarence Royce
Callie Thorne as Elena McNulty
Chad L. Coleman as Dennis "Cutty" Wise
Jamie Hector as Marlo Stanfield
Tray Chaney as Malik "Poot" Carr
Hassan Johnson as Roland "Wee-Bey" Brice
Method Man as Calvin "Cheese" Wagstaff
Maria Broom as Marla Daniels
Leo Fitzpatrick as Johnny
Joilet F. Harris as Officer Caroline Massey
Al Brown as Major Stanislaus Valchek
Jay Landsman as Lieutenant Dennis Mello
Ed Norris as Ed Norris
Richard Burton as Sean "Shamrock" McGinty
Brandon Fobbs as Fruit
Anwan Glover as Slim Charles
De'Rodd Hearns as Puddin
DeJuan Anderson as Bunk Junior
Anthony Cordova as Sean McNulty
Eric G. Ryan as Michael McNulty
Tony D. Head as Major Bobby Reed
Benjamin Busch as Officer Anthony Colicchio
Christopher Mann as Councilman Tony Gray
Frederick Strother as State Delegate Odell Watkins
Cleo Reginald Pizana as Chief of Staff Coleman Parker

Uncredited appearances
Justin Burley as Justin
Lee E. Cox as Aaron Castor
Richard DeAngelis as Colonel Raymond Foerster
Nakia Dillard as Lambert
Mustafa Harris as Lavell Mann
Derek Horton as Brian Baker
Barnett Lloyd as Major Marvin Taylor
Robert Neal Marshall as Comstat Police Major
Keith Moyer as Junk Man
Rick Otto as Kenneth Dozerman
Melvin T Russell as Jamal
Ryan Sands as Truck
Rico Sterling as Tyrell
Addison Switzer as Country
Rico Whelchel as Rico
Jonathan D. Wray as Tank
Esley Tate as Boo
Unknown as Dennis Carpenter (Elena's boyfriend)
Unknown as Drac
Unknown as Tote

First appearances

Police department
Off. Caroline Massey: Veteran Western district officer with an ear for street slang who has joined the major case unit.
Anthony Colicchio, Dozerman, Lambert and Truck: Drug enforcement unit officers working in Sergeant Carver's squad in the Western district.
Patrolmen Castor and Baker: African American Rookie Western district beat officers whom Major Colvin criticizes over their sense of direction and consequently forces to carry compasses.
Major Marvin Taylor: Baltimore Eastern District commander.
This is the first episode in which William Rawls appears as Deputy Commissioner of Operations aka Deputy Ops.

Politicians
Clarence Royce: Longstanding Mayor of Baltimore who is more concerned with keeping power than effecting change.
Tommy Carcetti: Ambitious city councilman lining up for a run at the mayor's seat.
Anthony Gray: Councilman and friend and colleague to Tommy Carcetti.
State Delegate Odell Watkins: Maryland politician and chief supporter of Marla Daniels.
Chief of Staff Coleman Parker: Mayor Royce's chief of staff and trusted adviser.

Drug dealers
Marlo Stanfield: Up and coming, extremely ruthless Westside drug kingpin.
Tote: Volatile lieutenant in the Stanfield Organization.
Fruit: Kangol hat wearing Stanfield crew chief.
Justin: Dopey young Stanfield drug dealer with a sideways cap.
Jamal: Laconic second in Fruit's crew.
Boo: Asthmatic drug dealer in Fruit's crew.
Dennis "Cutty" Wise: Recently paroled former enforcer in Barksdale organization trying to stay straight.
Slim Charles: Primary enforcer in the Barksdale organization.
Drac: Nephew of Proposition Joe and an undisciplined crew chief in his organization.
Lavelle Mann: Trusted lieutenant to Proposition Joe.

References

External links
"Time After Time" at HBO.com

The Wire (season 3) episodes
2004 American television episodes
Television episodes directed by Ed Bianchi
Television episodes written by David Simon